Angellift is the registered trade name of a noninvasive, removable perioral implant or prosthetic marketed by Medical Matrix, LLC used to lift and tighten the lower facial dermis. Angellift came about when a California surgeon wanted to provide his patients with a preview of their new appearance, but the concept is believed to date back more than 25 years in use by European actors. In the United States they are just one aspect of a growing trend in dental face lifts and cosmetic dentistry. The first ones in the United States were made in 2003, and are still in use. It was featured in the fifth season of Shark Tank.

The American Dental Association and Canadian Dental Association have not been invited to participate in the development of this device as it does not affect teeth or occlusion; although the device is fit within the mouth, the Angellift devices affect the skin surface and not the perioral cavity. The Angellift devices are cleaned in similar fashion as retainers or dentures.

In 2008 Angellift introduced an over-the-counter version of the original prescriptive model which could only be fit by dentists. The over-the-counter version does not require a dental visit as it does not attach to the teeth. Also in 2008, Angellift made application to the Food and Drug Administration for administration approval for general physicians and dermatologists.

References

Body modification
American brands
Medical devices